The Connecticut River Academy (CTRA) is a magnet high school for grades 9 – 12, located in East Hartford, Hartford County, Connecticut. 
It is co-located with Goodwin University, a small 4-year college which moved to the site in 2005. Connecticut River Academy opened in 2010 and graduated its first 4-year class in 2014. CTRA's Sustainability Theme provides hands-on learning in Environmental Studies and Advanced Manufacturing. CTRA's Early College Model offers college and career experiences, including the opportunity to earn tuition-free college credits. The academy is accredited by New England Association of Schools and Colleges (NEASC).

References

External links 

 
 Goodwin University

Buildings and structures in East Hartford, Connecticut
Schools in Hartford County, Connecticut
Public high schools in Connecticut
Magnet schools in Connecticut